Maitland is a town in South Australia known as the "heart of Yorke Peninsula" due to it being near the centre of the region. By road, it is 168 km west of Adelaide, 164 km south of Port Pirie and 46 km north of Minlaton.

Maitland is within a short driving distance of coastal towns on either side, with Port Victoria to the west and Ardrossan to the east, each within 25 km. It has a grain receiving depot operated by AWB Limited, serviced only by road. Maitland is also the home base of the Narungga Aboriginal Progress Association.

History
The town was named in 1872 after Lady Jean Maitland, who died in 1766 and was the wife of the 2nd Lord of Kilkerran, Sir James Fergusson, 1688-1759 2nd Baronet of Kilkerran, the Great-Great Grandmother of the governor of South Australia at that time, Sir James Fergusson 1832–1907. The local aborigines calling it "madu waltu", meaning white flint. Maitland's urban design is patterned after Adelaide's central business district: a neat grid of streets surrounded on all four sides by parkland.

In October 1884 the Adelaide Observer noted:
Maitland in situated about twenty-three miles from Moonta, on Yorke's Peninsula, and is about equidistant between the two Gulfs. The town stands about 490 feet above the sea, and is surrounded by some of the richest soil on the Peninsula. The township is only about nine years old, and has made steady progress, and bids fair to be the next largest town to Moonta on the Peninsula.

Climate
Maitland experiences a hot-summer mediterranean climate (Köppen climate classification: Csa), Trewartha: Csal); with hot, dry summers; mild to warm, relatively dry springs and autumns; and mild, winters with moderate precipitation.

Media
Maitland was home to a newspaper called the Maitland Watch (22 December 1911 – 26 June 1969). In 1969, the newspaper merged with Yorketown's the Pioneer (1898–1969) to become the short-lived Yorke Peninsula News Pictorial (3 July 1969 – 28 May 1970), which was then incorporated into the Yorke Peninsula Country Times from June 1970.

See also
 List of cities and towns in South Australia
 John Shannon (Australian politician)

References

External links

 Harvest Corner Website Yorke Peninsula Visitor Information Centre at Minlaton

Towns in South Australia
1872 establishments in Australia
Yorke Peninsula